Edmund Lazell was a member of the Constitutional Convention. He was born in Bridgewater, Massachusetts, USA in 1750. He married Mary Ford and had 2 children. He died on 30 Aug 1842 in Cummington, Hampshire, Massachusetts.

See also
Horatio Alger

References

1750 births
1842 deaths
People from Bridgewater, Massachusetts